USS Jason Dunham (DDG-109) is an  in the United States Navy. She is named after US Marine Corps corporal Jason Dunham, who was posthumously awarded the Medal of Honor for service in the Iraq War.

Jason Dunham is the 59th destroyer in her class and built by the Bath Iron Works in Bath, Maine. She was christened by Corporal Dunham's mother, Debra Dunham, the ship's sponsor and launched on 1 August 2009. Jason Dunham was commissioned on 13 November 2010.

Ship's history

Gallery

References

External links

 
 
 

 

2009 ships
Arleigh Burke-class destroyers
Destroyers of the United States
Ships built in Bath, Maine